T92 may refer to:

 T92 Howitzer Motor Carriage, a self-propelled howitzer developed during World War II
 T92 Light Tank, an American light tank developed in the 1950s